Keith Bewley (1947-2017), was a male swimmer who competed for England and a leading swimming coach .

Swimming career
He represented England and won a silver medal and two bronze medals in the medley, freestyle and butterfly events, at the 1966 British Empire and Commonwealth Games in Kingston, Jamaica.

Coaching
He coached the Northern Ireland national squad and from the Wigan Wasps Club he coached Margaret Kelly, Gaynor Stanley, June Croft, Ann Osgerby, Janet Osgerby and Steve Poulter.

References

1947 births
2017 deaths
English male swimmers
Commonwealth Games medallists in swimming
Commonwealth Games silver medallists for England
Commonwealth Games bronze medallists for England
Swimmers at the 1966 British Empire and Commonwealth Games
Medallists at the 1966 British Empire and Commonwealth Games